The Voice: Louder on Two (often shortened to simply Louder on Two) is a British television programme. It was the companion show to the BBC One music competition The Voice UK. It was broadcast on weeknights during the run of Series 3's live shows on BBC Two at 6:30pm.

It was axed before the fourth series began.

Format
The show featured interviews with the artists, mentors and hosts, as well as providing backstage clips and training videos. There were sometimes live acoustic performances from the artists.

Episodes

References

External links
 

2010s British music television series
2014 British television series debuts
2014 British television series endings
BBC reality television shows
Louder on Two
Television series by Warner Bros. Television Studios